Lady Love is the second studio album by American R&B recording artist LeToya originally scheduled for release several times in 2008. After corporate restructuring at Capitol Records the album was released on August 25, 2009 in the United States.

Luckett worked with a wide variety of collaborators for the album, including; Ne-Yo, Chris Brown and Bryan-Michael Cox. Featured guests include Ludacris, Estelle and Mims whilst some versions of the album will also have a bonus track which also features Bun B, Killa Kyleon, and Slim Thug. Described as "showcasing a more laid back and comfortable LeToya", Lady Love differs stylistically from its predecessor in that it incorporates less elements of hip-hop and hip-hop soul music, instead adopting a more polished, electronic sound. Lady Love debuted and peaked at number twelve on the US Billboard 200 Chart and number one on the US Billboard R&B/Hip-Hop Albums chart.

Background
Production for Lady Love originally began in 2007, with a release scheduled several times in 2008. However, due to the fusing of Capitol Records and Virgin Records, funding for many artists was frozen until the completion of the merger, affecting not only the release of Lady Love but also the release of "Obvious", the third single from Luckett's self-titled debut album. In early 2009, the release date for Lady Love was announced to be May 19, 2009, however it was later pushed back to June 16, 2009, before finally being set to August 24, 2009.

Composition
Lady Love is a contemporary R&B album, which Andy Kellman of Allmusic described as 'directed toward the pop market [...] heavier on gleaming synthesizers and in-your-face production.' The album begins with the 'conceited but confident up-tempo' "Lady Love" which is followed by the 'startingly brash', 'electronically soaked' "She Ain't Got..." on which LeToya displays a 'fierce personality' through her vocals and the lyrics, one line reading "Bout to put my foot down on homegirl's neck, to make her see that, she ain't got s*** on me". From this point on, the album slows into more mid-tempos and ballads, such as the Ne-Yo composition "Not Anymore", which 'tells a story about a young lady who decides enough is enough and tells her no good womanizing partner to leave' and the 'break-up anthem' "Over". "Regret", featuring rapper Ludacris, has been repeatedly likened to the Mary Mary hit single "God in Me", with its 'rat-a-tat snares' and 'alternately gliding and prodding vocal attack', while LeToya's "breathy" vocal performance on the "steamy" and "sensual" "I Need a U" – complete with a "burning" electric guitar solo – has been likened to the style of Janet Jackson. On the "supremely smooth" "Take Away Love" (featuring Estelle), LeToya plays the part of a lover who is having difficulty getting her lover to realise that she "doesn't want a relationship with him" because she is "still in love" with her "ex" and he "doesn't understand that". While on the 'densely layered' "Good To Me" which has been described as 'serious and sexy at the same time' and likened to some of the material on Usher's Confessions album, LeToya names and describes the qualities she wants in her ideal man, emphasising that he must be "good to [her]". The tempo of the album 'slows down towards the end' with the songs "Drained", "Tears" and the Marsha Ambrosius-penned "Matter". Shortly before closing the album, LeToya "shows off her upper vocal register" on "Don't Need You" which has been herladed as "LeToya's best recording to-date" by Timothy Michael Carson of About.com.

Release and promotion
Amidst much anticipation for the album release, Luckett released a five-track sampler on May 19, 2009. The sampler features first single "Not Anymore" and 1 minute 30 second snippets of "Regret", "She Ain't Got...", "Lady Love" and "Matter". The album was released on physically and digitally on August 25, 2009 in the US and worldwide a day earlier. An explicit version of the album is also available and bears a Parental Advisory label. To celebrate the album's release, LeToya hosted an album release party at Cain in New York City on August 27, 2009.

Singles

"Not Anymore", the lead single, was produced by Bei Maejor and co-produced and written by Ne-Yo. Released in February 2009, it became the most added song at urban radio, debuting at number ninety-eight on the US Billboard Hot R&B/Hip-Hop Songs chart before peaking at number eighteen and just missing the US Billboard Hot 100 singles chart, peaking at number one-hundred-and-seven. A music video for the single was shot on February 13, 2009. Directed by Bryan Barber, the music video is set in the 1960s and is split into 3 sections/time periods – 1961, 1964 and 1968. The sets, costumes and props change accordingly in each section to show the trends, fashions and styles of those particular years. The video was released on March 10, 2009 and peaked at number three on the 106 & Park video countdown.

"She Ain't Got..." the album's second single, was produced by Cory Bold and written by LeToya, Andre Merritt, Chris Brown and Bold. Chosen by fans, it became the first LeToya single to carry a Parental Advisory label, though a "clean" version was also released. It became the most added song on rhythmic radio, thus peaking at number thirty-nine on the Billboard Rhythmic Top 40 chart, while peaking at number seventy-five on the Billboard Pop 100 Airplay chart and number twenty on the Billboard Hot Dance Club Play. However, the single was most successful in Japan where it peaked at number forty-nine on the Japan Hot 100. A music video, directed by Bryan Barber was shot on June 3, 2009 and premiered on Yahoo Music on June 30, 2009,  featuring guest star Major League Baseball players Orlando Hudson and Matt Kemp of the Los Angeles Dodgers as well as Baseball Hall of Fame member Dave Winfield.

"Regret", featuring rapper Ludacris, was produced by Tank and Jerry "Texx" Franklin and written by Tank, LeToya, Franklin, K. Stephens, J. Valentine, R. Newt and C. Bridges. Released as the third single – based only on downloads and airplay – "Regret" peaked at number eight on the US Billboard Hot R&B/Hip-Hop Songs chart and debuted at number one-hundred on the Billboard Hot 100, making it LeToya's first single since her debut; "Torn", to enter the US Hot 100, peaking at number seventy-eight. It also peaked at number forty-two on the Billboard Radio Songs chart and was listed at number six on AOL Music's "Top R&B Songs of 2009" list. The music video for "Regret" was premiered on BET's 106 & Park on November 11, 2009 before being ranked at number twenty-three on BET: Notarized: Top 100 Videos of 2009 countdown.

"Good To Me", produced by Tank and Jerry "Texx" Franklin and written by Tank, Franklin, K. Stephens, R. Newt and J. Valentine, was released as the album's fourth and final single. Though the song failed to chart, a music video directed by makeup artist AJ Crimson and co-starring model-actor Keston Karter was released on February 11, 2010.

Critical reception

Lady Love received generally positive reviews from critics. Samantha Greaves of Examiner.com described the album as "very diverse", listing "Take Away Love" as "One of the gems on Lady Love" and praised "LeToya's ability to think out the box and to bring to R&B music something different than the vast majority". Meanwhile, Timothy Michael Carson of About.com praised LeToya's "versatility" and "soft soprano vocals", but wrote that "many of the songs tend to sound alike" and so "Lady Love can quickly become a tiresome listen". Carson commented that "LeToya's vocals are what kept [him] replaying the album over", lending particularly praise to the tracks "I Need a U" and "Don't Need U" – which he named "LeToya's best recording to-date" – before describing the album as a "great listen". Nathan S. of DJBooth.net also gave a particularly favorable review of "I Need a U", which he described as a "breathy and burning track that should set the sheets on fire". Nathan also lent praise to LeToya's "fierce personality" on the "remarkable" "She Ain't Got...". However, he noted that "Lady Love isn't a perfect album" and "at times it feels uninspired and overly deliberate" but wrote that "it's clearly the work of a woman coming into her own as an artist" and so promised that he is "not going to attach a “formerly of Destiny's Child” onto LeToya Luckett's name. She will finally be, simply, LeToya. She's earned it". Andy Kellman of Allmusic gave a more mixed review however, describing the album as being "just as scattered and uneven as LeToya's self-titled debut", but noted that there are no "shortage of high points", listing; "Regret", the "pummeling, startlingly brash" "She Ain't Got..." and "the melancholy" "Take Away Love" as particular stand-outs. On the contrary, Diana Ayok of SoulCulture rated the album 3.5 out of 5, noting it as "better and stronger than [LeToya's] first self titled album" and heralded it as "a genuinely impressive album" that she "would recommend"  "to any R&B lover".

Commercial performance
In the US, Lady Love opened with first week sales of 32,900 copies, debuting at the top of the Billboard Top R&B/Hip-Hop Albums chart, replacing Ledisi's Turn Me Loose, on September 12, 2009, where it spent a total of thirty-two weeks and number twelve on the Billboard 200, where it spent a total of twelve weeks. The album failed to match or better the sales or chart performance of its predecessor and did not chart outside of the United States.

Track listing

Personnel
Credits adapted from the album's liner notes and Allmusic.com

LeToya Luckett – lead vocals, background vocals, executive producer
Estelle – background vocals
Ankur Malhotra – A&R
Leonard Brooks – A&R
Ronette Bowie – A&R
Darius "My Turn" Jones – A&R direction
Damon Thompson – associate producer
Nicole Frantz – creative director
Terry "TR" Ross – executive producer
Chris Hicks – executive producer
Jeff Robinson – management
Suzette Williams – management
Marketing – Leota Blacknor – marketing
Julian Peploe – design
Mike Ruiz – photography
Marni Senofonte – stylist
Chris Morgan – guitar
Andre Merritt – arranger, producer, vocal production
Anthony Palazzole – engineer
Brian Springer – engineer, mixing
Danny Cheung – engineer
Geno Regist – engineer
John Hanes – engineer
Kenneth "SoundZ" Coby – engineer, producer
Ralph Cacciurri – engineer
Richard Furch – engineer
Ashley Stagg – engineer assistant
Tom Roberts – engineer assistant
Chris "The Finalizer" Bellman – mastering
Dave Pensado – mixing
Joshua Fowler – mixing
Kevin "KD" Davis – mixing
Serban Ghenea – mixing
Bei Maejor – producer
Cory Bold – producer
Jay Henchman – producer
Da Internz – producer
Elvis "BlacK Elvis" Williams – producer
Harold Lilly – producer
Jerry "Texx" Franklin – producer
Ne-Yo – producer
Ron "Neff-U" Feemster – producer
Ryan Leslie – producer, programming, engineer, background vocals, other instrumentation
Tank – producer
Terry "MaddScientist" Thomas – producer
T-Minus – producer
Warren "Oak" Felder – producer, vocal producer
Chris Brown – vocal producer, arranger
Cri$tyle – vocal producer, background vocals
Frankie Storm - vocal producer
Kristina Stephens - vocal producer, background vocals
J. Valentine – vocal producer
Marsha Ambrosius – vocal producer
Robert Teamer – vocal producer
Sauce – vocal producer

Charts

Weekly charts

Year-end charts

Release history

References

2009 albums
LeToya Luckett albums
Albums produced by Maejor
Albums produced by Ryan Leslie
Albums produced by T-Minus (record producer)
Albums produced by Theron Feemster
Capitol Records albums